Webster Thayer (1857–1933) was a judge of the Superior Court of Massachusetts. Judge Thayer may also refer to:

Amos Madden Thayer (1841–1905), judge of the United States Court of Appeals for the Eighth Circuit
Rufus Thayer (1850–1917), judge of the United States Court for China

See also
Justice Thayer (disambiguation)